Forslund is a Swedish surname. Notable people with the surname include:

Albert Forslund, Swedish politician and trade union organizer
Bengt Forslund, Swedish film producer, screenwriter and production manager 
Constance Forslund, American actress  
Gus Forslund (1906–1962), Swedish-born professional ice hockey right wing player 
John Forslund, American sports announcer
Kenneth G. Forslund, Swedish politician
Linus Forslund, Swedish bandy player
Tomas Forslund, Swedish former professional ice hockey right wing

Swedish-language surnames